The Art of Hustle is the eighth studio album by American rapper Yo Gotti. It was released on February 19, 2016, by Epic Records and Yo Gotti's CMG record label. The album was supported by two singles: "Down in the DM", and "Law" featuring E-40.

The album debuted at number four on the US Billboard 200 chart, 61,000 album-equivalent units in its first week.

Singles
"Down in the DM" was released as the album's first single on October 27, 2015. The song was produced by Ben Billions and Schife. The music video for the single premiered on February 4, 2016 via Gotti's VEVO channel. The song has peaked at number 13 on the US Billboard Hot 100 chart.

"Law" featuring E-40, was sent to rhythmic crossover radio March 28, 2016, as the album's second official single. The song was produced by Big Fruit. The music video of the song was released on April 7, 2016. The song has peaked at number 79 on the US Billboard Hot 100.

Commercial performance
The Art of Hustle debuted at number four on the US Billboard 200 chart, 61,000 album-equivalent units, (including 45,000 copies sold) in its first week. The album ended up spending a total of 24 weeks. On December 7, 2018, the album was certified gold by the Recording Industry Association of America (RIAA) for combined sales and album-equivalent units of over 500,000 units in the United States.

Track listing

Charts

Weekly charts

Year-end charts

Certifications

Release history

References

2016 albums
Yo Gotti albums
Epic Records albums
Collective Music Group albums
Albums produced by Drumma Boy
Albums produced by Honorable C.N.O.T.E.
Albums produced by Timbaland
Albums produced by Street Symphony